Saint Croix is a provincial electoral district for the Legislative Assembly of New Brunswick, Canada. The district includes the Town of St. Stephen and the Town of St. Andrews.

It was created as Western Charlotte in 1994 by merging the old districts of Charlotte West and St. Stephen-Milltown save for Deer Island and Campobello Island which became part of Fundy Isles, the rather atypical name of "Western Charlotte" was chosen to prevent confusion with the old smaller district of "Charlotte West". The riding also added a small piece of territory from Charlotte Centre.

In 2006, the district again added Campobello Island and the name was changed from Western Charlotte to Charlotte-Campobello.

In 2013, the district expanded northward adding the McAdam area.

In 2016, the riding was renamed Saint Croix.

Members of the Legislative Assembly

Election results

Saint Croix

Charlotte-Campobello

Western Charlotte

References

External links 
Website of the Legislative Assembly of New Brunswick

New Brunswick provincial electoral districts
St. Stephen, New Brunswick